Powys Thomas (25 December 1925 – 22 June 1977) was a British-born actor who played an important role in the development of theatre in Canada.

History 
He was born in Wales in December 1925. His early education was at Rendcomb College, Cirencester, Gloucestershire. He was known there as Willie. He was a leading light in the school's many theatrical ventures. He left Rendcomb in 1944 with a history scholarship to Queens' College, Cambridge. Soon thereafter he was called up as a Bevin Boy (coal miner apprentice) to serve as a coal miner in Wales for the duration of World War II. He studied at the Bristol Old Vic Theatre School. He was a member of the Royal Shakespeare Company at Stratford-upon-Avon from 1951 to 1956. Thomas came to Canada in 1956 and worked for the Canadian Broadcasting Corporation. He was one of the first actors at the Stratford Shakespeare Festival in Ontario and was the first director for the actors' workshops there. With Michel Saint-Denis, he founded the National Theatre School of Canada in 1960 and was artistic director for the English section until 1965. Thomas also founded the Vancouver Playhouse school.

He gave memorable performances in King Lear in Vancouver, The Three Musketeers, Waiting for Godot and Lorenzaccio at Stratford (Ontario) and in Three Sisters in Winnipeg.

Thomas can be seen as Hudson in "The Last Voyage of Henry Hudson" a role to which he gives Shakespearean dimensions, black and white (Educational Film Board of Canada) on YouTube.

Death 
Thomas died suddenly during a holiday in Wales on 22 June 1977, at the age of 51.

References

External links 
 

1925 births
1977 deaths
20th-century Welsh male actors
Alumni of Queens' College, Cambridge
British emigrants to Canada
Academic staff of the National Theatre School of Canada
Welsh male stage actors
Bevin Boys
Welsh miners